The Becscie Formation is a geologic formation in Quebec. It preserves fossils dating back to the early Silurian period.

Description
The Becscie Formation is 80 to 85 meters thick. It overlies the Ordovician-Silurian boundary on Anticosti Island, marking a major oceanic and climatic changeover from the glacial sea-level lowstand and interglacial highstand cycles of the underlying Ellis Bay Formation to the more stable warming climate of the earliest Silurian, and extends approximately parallel to an ancient coastline some 200 km east to west. The formation is divided into two members, a lower Fox Point Member (spanning the Viridita lenticularis Biozone), and an upper Chabot Member (spanning the Virgiana barrandei Biozone).

Fossil content

See also

 List of fossiliferous stratigraphic units in Quebec

References

 

Silurian Quebec
Silurian southern paleotemperate deposits
Ordovician southern paleotropical deposits
Silurian southern paleotropical deposits